James Bobin is a British filmmaker. He worked as a director and writer on Da Ali G Show and helped create the characters of Ali G, Borat, and Brüno. With Bret McKenzie and Jemaine Clement, he co-created Flight of the Conchords. He directed the feature films The Muppets (2011), Muppets Most Wanted (2014), Alice Through the Looking Glass (2016), and Dora and the Lost City of Gold (2019).

Career
Bobin  worked as a director and writer on The 11 O'Clock Show and Da Ali G Show, and helped create the characters of Ali G, Borat, and Brüno. In 2003 and 2004, he directed and co-wrote all of the 12 episodes of Ali G in da USAiii for HBO.

With Bret McKenzie and Jemaine Clement, he co-created, wrote and directed Flight of the Conchords, also for HBO. Bobin had previously seen Clement and McKenzie perform and signed on to co-create the show. In 2011, he signed a deal with HBO.

His feature film directorial debut, The Muppets, a musical-comedy film written by Jason Segel and Nicholas Stoller, was released in 2011 and became a critical and commercial hit and won an Oscar for Best Original Song. The film earned him his second BAFTA nomination at the 66th British Academy Film Awards. He wrote (with Nicholas Stoller) and directed a follow-up, Muppets Most Wanted, which was released in 2014. Bobin next directed the sequel Alice Through the Looking Glass (2016). In February 2016, it was announced that he would direct a Jump Street-Men in Black crossover film, however plans for the movie fell through. In 2011, he signed a first look deal with HBO.

His most recent film, Dora and the Lost City of Gold, is a live-action adaptation of TV series Dora the Explorer with Isabela Moner as the title character. The film was theatrically released in the United States on August 9, 2019, by Paramount Pictures. In 2020, it was announced that Bobin was in talks to direct a remake of Clue. In October 2021, it was announced that Bobin would direct and executive produce an adaptation of Percy Jackson & the Olympians for Disney+.

Awards
Bobin received his first BAFTA nomination (British Academy of Film and Television Award) for Best Comedy Series in 2000 for his work on The 11 O'Clock Show. He also won an award from the Royal Television Society, as well as a Silver Rose from the Montreux Television Festival. He won a Writers Guild of America Award in 2007.

Bobin was nominated for Outstanding Writing and Directing Emmys for Da Ali G Show in 2003, and again in 2005. In 2008 and 2009, he was nominated for Outstanding Writing, Directing, and Original Music for Flight of the Conchords, and in 2009, also received an Outstanding Comedy Series nomination for his work as executive producer.

In 2011, Bobin's first feature film, The Muppets, won an Oscar for Best Original Song for the song "Man or Muppet" written by Bret McKenzie. Bobin himself was nominated for the BAFTA Award for Outstanding Debut by a British Writer, Director or Producer.

Reality TV
James appeared as himself in one episode of a British documentary series Modern Times. He was one part of a household in search of a flatmate.

Filmography
Short film
 Spyz (2003)

Feature film
 The Muppets (2011)
 Muppets Most Wanted (2014) (Also writer)
 Alice Through the Looking Glass (2016)
 Dora and the Lost City of Gold (2019)

Television

References

External links 
 
 Biography on HBO.com
New York Times bio

British film directors
British television directors
Comedy film directors
Emmy Award winners
Fantasy film directors
Living people
People educated at The Portsmouth Grammar School
Writers Guild of America Award winners
Year of birth missing (living people)